National Park is a borough in Gloucester County, in the U.S. state of New Jersey. As of the 2020 United States census, the borough's population was 3,026, a decrease of 10 (−0.3%) from the 2010 census count of 3,036, which in turn reflected a decline of 169 (−5.3%) from the 3,205 counted in the 2000 census. Despite its name, National Park is neither a national park nor associated with one.

National Park had the 18th-highest property tax rate in New Jersey in 2020, with an equalized rate of 4.446% compared to 3.212% in the county as a whole and a statewide average of 2.279%.

History

In 1777, during the American Revolutionary War, the Continental Army under command of George Washington constructed two forts on the Delaware River to block the approach to Philadelphia: Fort Mifflin on the Pennsylvania side and Fort Mercer on the New Jersey side, which is now National Park. The fort was named in honor of Brigadier General Hugh Mercer who died earlier that year at the Battle of Princeton. A park, monument, and museum commemorate the fort on its original site.

On October 22, 1777, in the Battle of Red Bank, an attack by 900 Hessian troops, serving under British Major General William Howe, who then occupied Philadelphia, was repelled, with heavy losses on the Hessian side, including the death of their commander, Colonel Carl Emil Kurt von Donop, by the 600 Continental defenders under Colonel Christopher Greene. After the loss of Fort Mifflin, Fort Mercer was abandoned without a fight when Lord Charles Cornwallis landed 2,000 British troops nearby on November 18.

In 1895, the area began to be commercially developed as a religious retreat for members of the Methodist Episcopal Church and called National Park on the Delaware. The founder, the Rev. James E. Lake, also created Ocean City, New Jersey.

National Park was formally established as a borough by an act of the New Jersey Legislature on April 15, 1902, from portions of West Deptford Township. The town name probably originated in reference to the county park at Red Bank Battlefield.

Geography
According to the U.S. Census Bureau, the borough had a total area of 1.44 square miles (3.73 km2), including 1.01 square miles (2.61 km2) of land and 0.43 square miles (1.12 km2) of water (30.14%). The borough borders West Deptford Township and the Delaware River. The Delaware River shore faces the southern end of Philadelphia, across from the mouth of the Schuylkill River and Fort Mifflin.

Demographics

2010 census

The Census Bureau's 2006–2010 American Community Survey showed that (in 2010 inflation-adjusted dollars) median household income was $65,852 (with a margin of error of +/− $5,987) and the median family income was $70,341 (+/− $8,049). Males had a median income of $51,886 (+/− $2,493) versus $32,788 (+/− $5,594) for females. The per capita income for the borough was $26,699 (+/− $2,574). About 4.1% of families and 4.3% of the population were below the poverty line, including 6.8% of those under age 18 and 6.7% of those age 65 or over.

2000 census
As of the 2000 census, there were 3,205 people, 1,111 households, and 865 families residing in the borough. The racial makeup of the borough was 98.35% White, 0.09% Black, 0.25% Native American, 0.25% Asian, 0.03% Pacific Islander, 0.53% from other races, and 0.50% from two or more races. Hispanic or Latino of any race were 1.44% of the population.

There were 1,111 households, out of which 37.3% had children under the age of 18 living with them, 58.2% were married couples living together, 14.0% had a female householder with no husband present, and 22.1% were non-families. 18.6% of all households were made up of individuals, and 8.6% had someone living alone who was 65 years of age or older. The average household size was 2.86 and the average family size was 3.24.

In the borough, the population was spread out, with 26.4% under the age of 18, 9.3% from 18 to 24, 29.7% from 25 to 44, 22.2% from 45 to 64, and 12.5% who were 65 years of age or older. The median age was 37 years. For every 100 females, there were 99.2 males. For every 100 females age 18 and over, there were 93.8 males.

The median income for a household in the borough was $48,534, and the median income for a family was $51,535. Males had a median income of $35,102 versus $27,398 for females. The per capita income for the borough was $18,048. About 6.5% of families and 7.6% of the population were below the poverty line, including 6.7% of those under age 18 and 7.9% of those age 65 or over.

Government

Local government
National Park is governed under the Borough form of New Jersey municipal government, which is used in 218 municipalities (of the 564) statewide, making it the most common form of government in New Jersey. The governing body is comprised of the Mayor and the Borough Council, with all positions elected at-large on a partisan basis as part of the November general election. The Mayor is elected directly by the voters to a four-year term of office. The Borough Council is comprised of six members elected to serve three-year terms on a staggered basis, with two seats coming up for election each year in a three-year cycle. The Borough form of government used by National Park is a "weak mayor / strong council" government in which council members act as the legislative body with the mayor presiding at meetings and voting only in the event of a tie. The mayor can veto ordinances subject to an override by a two-thirds majority vote of the council. The mayor makes committee and liaison assignments for council members, and most appointments are made by the mayor with the advice and consent of the council.

Joy Hibbs Gunn was selected by the Borough Council in August 2014 from three names nominated by the municipal Democratic committee to fill the vacant seat of Dennis Mehaffey, who resigned in the previous month due to conflicts with his work schedule. in the November 2014 general election, Hibbs was elected to serve the balance of the term though December 2016.

, the Mayor of National Park is Democrat Mark Cooper, whose term of office ends December 31, 2023. Members of the Borough Council are Jason Bish (D, 2023), Dennis R. Burke (D, 2022), James J. Butler (D, 2024), Aimee Hart (D, 2022), Ronald D. Sparks Jr. (D, 2024) and Kate Wadsworth (D, 2023; appointed to serve an unexpired term).

Aimee Hart was appointed to fill the seat expiring in December 2022 that had been held by Joy Gunn.

Federal, state, and county representation
National Park is located in the 1st Congressional District and is part of New Jersey's 3rd state legislative district.

Politics
As of March 2011, there were a total of 2,045 registered voters in National Park, of which 1,021 (49.9%) were registered as Democrats, 213 (10.4%) were registered as Republicans and 811 (39.7%) were registered as Unaffiliated. There were no voters registered to other parties.

In the 2020 Presidential election, Republican Donald Trump received 823 votes and Democrat Joe Biden received 717 votes. In the 2016 presidential election, Republican Donald Trump received 627 votes, ahead of Democrat Hillary Clinton with 550 votes. In the 2012 presidential election, Democrat Barack Obama received 63.8% of the vote (819 cast), ahead of Republican Mitt Romney with 34.4% (442 votes), and other candidates with 1.8% (23 votes), among the 1,301 ballots cast by the borough's 2,064 registered voters (17 ballots were spoiled), for a turnout of 63.0%. In the 2008 presidential election, Democrat Barack Obama received 59.5% of the vote (892 cast), ahead of Republican John McCain with 37.3% (560 votes) and other candidates with 1.7% (26 votes), among the 1,500 ballots cast by the borough's 2,164 registered voters, for a turnout of 69.3%. In the 2004 presidential election, Democrat John Kerry received 60.9% of the vote (868 ballots cast), outpolling Republican George W. Bush with 37.6% (536 votes) and other candidates with 0.7% (15 votes), among the 1,426 ballots cast by the borough's 2,069 registered voters, for a turnout percentage of 68.9.

In the 2013 gubernatorial election, Republican Chris Christie received 64.6% of the vote (469 cast), ahead of Democrat Barbara Buono with 32.0% (232 votes), and other candidates with 3.4% (25 votes), among the 746 ballots cast by the borough's 2,041 registered voters (20 ballots were spoiled), for a turnout of 36.6%. In the 2009 gubernatorial election, Democrat Jon Corzine received 46.2% of the vote (408 ballots cast), ahead of Republican Chris Christie with 40.2% (355 votes), Independent Chris Daggett with 10.2% (90 votes) and other candidates with 0.8% (7 votes), among the 883 ballots cast by the borough's 2,095 registered voters, yielding a 42.1% turnout.

Education
The National Park School District serves public school students in pre-kindergarten through sixth grade at National Park Elementary School. As of the 2018–19 school year, the district, comprised of one school, had an enrollment of 274 students and 24.8 classroom teachers (on an FTE basis), for a student–teacher ratio of 11.0:1.

Students in public school for seventh through twelfth grades attend Gateway Regional High School, which serves students from the boroughs of National Park, Wenonah, Westville and Woodbury Heights as part of the Gateway Regional High School District. As of the 2018–19 school year, the high school had an enrollment of 879 students and 81.5 classroom teachers (on an FTE basis), for a student–teacher ratio of 10.8:1.

Students are also eligible to attend Gloucester County Institute of Technology, a four-year high school in Deptford Township that provides technical and vocational education. Because GCIT is a public school, its students do not pay tuition.

The Roman Catholic Diocese of Camden operated St. Matthews School, which had campuses in National Park and the Verga section of West Deptford Township, New Jersey. In 2007 it was consolidated into Holy Trinity Regional School, in Deptford Township. In 2017, it was moved to the former St. Patrick's Building in Woodbury due to the superior condition of that building, according to the archdiocese. It opened as Holy Angels Catholic School which still operates. Guardian Angels Regional School is a K-8 school that operates under the auspices of the Diocese of Camden, and accepts students from National Park. Its PreK-3 campus is in Gibbstown while its 4-8 campus is in Paulsboro.

Transportation

Roads and highways

County Route 642, Interstate 295, and U.S. Route 130 pass just outside the borough in neighboring West Deptford Township.

Public transportation
NJ Transit local bus service is available on the 455 route operating between Cherry Hill Mall and Paulsboro.

Notable people

People who were born in, residents of, or otherwise closely associated with National Park include:
 Nick Gage (born 1980), professional wrestler
 Sue Lowden (born 1952), Miss New Jersey 1973 winner who is a former Chairwoman of the Nevada Republican Party and a former state senator in Nevada
 Eleanor Vadala (born 1923), chemist, materials engineer and balloonist

References

External links

 Official National Park website

 
1902 establishments in New Jersey
Borough form of New Jersey government
Boroughs in Gloucester County, New Jersey
Populated places established in 1902